Rich Girl is a 1991 American romantic drama film directed by Joel Bender and written from the screenplay of Robert Elliot. The film stars Jill Schoelen in the title role, along with Cherie Currie and Paul Gleason in the supporting cast. The leading gentleman was played by Don Michael Paul, with live music. The film centers around a wealthy girl from Bel-Air, who is tired of living off her wealthy family's name and decides to prove her independence from her overbearing father and obnoxious ex-fiancé by making her way in life by becoming a waitress at a nightclub and ends up falling in love with one of the club's rock musicians.

The film had wide list of performer and showcased award-winning musicians like Willie Dixon and Cherie Currie. The bands featured Precious Metal (band), Darling Cruel, Celebrity Skin (band), with Dance group Miranda Rap group. The film had wide release and was originally up for award nominations for the soundtrack by award-winning composer Jay Chattaway.

Originally shelved, the film got picked for a limited release in select theaters nationwide with mixed reviews, most famously from The Washington Post. On a tight Budgets the production of the film grew more success from the live performances by Jill Schoelen and Don Michael Paul themselves. Marketing the films tagline "he was like nothing she'd ever known, and everything she'd ever wanted".

Plot 
  
The film opens up with 21-year-old Courtney Wells (Jill Schoelen) driving out of her Family's Bel-Air Mansion in her Red Corvette with a license plate reading RICH GIRL. She begins speeding on to the highway of Beverly Hills, catching the attention of a highway patrol motorcyclist. In an attempt to ask her out, he winds up taking her license to run her plates after her automatic rejection, only to be told it is too much trouble to give her a ticket due her powerful family's name. She is then let go, and she backs up, knocking down the officer's motorcycle.

On her drive to visit her fianće Jeffrey (Sean Kanan) who only is with her because he interns for her father. She calls him in the middle of him sleeping with her best friend Diane (Melanie Tomlin) who he has been having an affair with for months along with other friends of Courtney. When Courtney arrives at his loft, after Jeffrey kicks out his mistress, she confides in him that she feels trapped and pressured by her father and that she is not ready to get married despite that they had already made the plans to marry after he graduated and booked the country club for their wedding, much to his dismay. Courtney leaves the engagement ring in his drink and leaves him angry and he violently throws the glass at the wall.

She then goes to visit her father Marvin Wells (Paul Gleason) and his young new wife Carol (Ann Gillespie) She tells her father that she is not returning for the spring semester of senior year, her father then offers to set her up with a job at Lincoln Center. But she then breaks into an argument telling her father she is more than just Marvin Wells daughter and tired of being handed everything to her. Upset by this Marvin blames himself because of her mother's death. Courtney then breaks into tears angered by everyone pressuring her on how to live her life. But her father wants her to make up her mind on what she wants after he learns of her canceling her engagement. Asking what she is trying to prove, she admits that she wants to prove she can live without his support and that she doesn't need anyone's help, that she can make it on her own. To her father's angry discouragement, she runs out of his home, he yells "If walk out of here, don't come crawling back".

The scene then cuts to Courtney at her family's investor and accountant office. She tells her family's advisor Howard (Dennis Holahan) she wants to take money from an account of her mother's estate. Howard warns her the money is only to be drawn in a showing of need, and he would need to talk to the bank trustees, which her father controls.

She then goes out in search of a job, with rejection as she has no work experience and her degrees are only in music. She begins looking for a penthouse, only to discover it's out of her budget. For another job interview she refuses to take a typing test as she feels it's beneath her. On her way out a secretary named Angela Carpoli (Ingrid Berg) tells her that she wouldn't have wanted to work there anyway and suggest "Roccos" a Nightclub with live music from A-list performers. When Courtney ask why she doesn't work, she responds that her boyfriend wouldn't allow her to, but tells her to put her down as a reference because she is good friends with the owner. Courtney laughs at the fact she would rather clean up the place than be another secretary.

When arrives at Roccos down south of Los Angeles, she meets the owner (Ron Karabatsos) who kindly gives her an application, only upsetting his bartender Tracy (Trudi Fooristal). Roccos explains to Courteney how hundreds of girls come to club looking for work because of the action. But he needs her in case of emergency as his girls are all liabilities. And when she mentions Angela's name, it upset Rocco after an event when Angela almost costed him his Licour License, but after viewing Courtney's I.D. he does a background check and finds out that she is the daughter of Marvin Wells. When he returns, he finds that she left and he calls her penthouse just as she gets out of the shower. Much to her excitement she lands the Job as management Trainee.

The next scene is a night at the club, with Precious Metal (band) performing on the stage. And Courtney being trained by another waitress making sure all the other waitresses don't rip off the customers. Another patron then hits on Courtney, resulting in her pouring a pitcher of beer all over him. Then in the bathroom a performer named Michelle Wilson (Cherie Currie) is wiping the coke from her teeth along with other bandmates. Rocco then gets into a heated argument with an upcoming band who refuses to pay their tab. Rocco then notices one of the waitresses stealing a tip. Michelle and bandmate Rick (Don Michael Paul) are performing, catching the attention of Courtney as she is delivering drinks. Her and Rick stare at each other from across the room and focus on each other throughout the song. But Courtney then returns to work with Ethel the cook (Gail Neely), Rick then enters the kitchen offering to buy Courtney a drink, only to rejected after she notices the lady's thing hanging out of his pocket. Getting ready to clock out after a long night, Courtney is tired and heads home. She turns on the Television and plays her answering machine only to hear that Jeffrey is on his way back home from New York and heard she moved. This only upsets her and she lays down in bed from exhaustion and watches the advertisement of one of her Father's Businesses

The next day Marvin and the Family Lawyer consult on whether or not to allow Courtney to open her trustfund her grandparents left her. But her father denies permission to lawyer, as he believes this punishment since she is finding out what it means to be on her own and she has a lot to learn.

The scene progresses to Courtney at work serving the drink and Rocco comes to tell Courtney to be assertive and remove two men from the premises. Nervous she goes and asks them to leave and when the refuse she threatens them that Rocco will "Teach them a lesson of they don't". They leave and call her bitch, but Courtney is excited to see Rick and Michelle performing again. They make eye contact again as Rick performs a song he dedicated to Corutney. Rick then gets off the stage to bring Courtney up with him and Michelle. He then starts to sing with Corutney in his arms and begins to kiss and lick her neck, much to Michelles' surprise. Courtney then grows uncomfortable to the attention of crowd and Rocco's mad look, so she then leaves the stage. Courtney is then scolded by Michelle's friend who says that Michelle and Rick use to have a relationship and she still has feelings for Rick. But Courtney only argues that he was the one who pulled her onstage and started to hit on her. But the friend let's her know that Rick hits on all the waitresses looking for new talent and makes a competition out of with his bandmates. As Courtney is getting back to her station, Rick then confronts Courtney, only for to slap him and tell not to ever do that again. But he only wanted to dance with her and she tells him to leave her alone. Rocco then confronts Rick telling him that Courtney is off limits, but he assured him that Courtney probably hates him after the stunt and Roccos demands it stays that way.

On Courtney's way out of the club, the two men Courtney kicked out of the club come out their car as they were waiting for Courtney to get off work. They grab her and slap her, but Rick on his Motorcycle smoking a cigarette sees the men about to rape her and he intervenes and fights them both off, allowing Courntey to escape. But when she sees one of the men pull out a knife she stays to warn Rick. Rocco then comes out and scared off the men and courtney picks up the bracelet her mother gave to her. Rick offers her a ride home but she kindly declines.

The next Day we see Jefferey at his Father's office discusses financial issues, and is in pending to get more money, but mentions his engagement to Marvin Wells daughter, this scene then cuts to Courtney at her accountant's office, angry that she is not retrieving any money from her trustfund, but her father's influence is denying her every cent. As she even had to downgrade to used Volkswagen. On her drive out she sees a Rick riding on his motorcycle and follows him and sees that Rick is giving money to his Father who is drug addict living on the streets, Courtney drives off.

The next night Courtney is back at the club picking up her check. When she leaves the lights go out and Rocco pulls out his gun to go inspect and sees that the girls are surprising him on his birthday, much to his relief. With the club empty everyone is celebrating and dancing with two of the musicians arguing about not getting paid enough as they are struggling to afford their necessities but are relying on their next gig to get them a big check. In a slow dance Rick sees Courtney from across the room and the two join in a dance. She thanks him for the other night and the two embrace in a kiss, only to have Michelle heartbroken and angry. As Courtney leaves, Rick offers take her on a ride which she reluctantly accepts after he ask what is she afraid of. The two head to his studio and drink some beer. When Courtney picks up his guitar, he discovers that she very talented. She tells him she took lessons when she was young and he admits he practiced on the a beat up piano he practice on at a hotel he was raised at. She asks how he writes his music and he answers that he must get turned on by something and he his inspired at this moment. They end up having sex and the scene transitions back to the club with two now a couple and Michelle very disappointed. The next morning Rick takes Courtney through the neighborhood he grew up in and ask her where she is from, only for her to answer "Some place I'd like to forget". The two go to hotel he grew up and he plays the piano he learned on, catching the attention of two little girls as they see couple kiss. The scene cuts back a restaurant where the two are on a date seeing a jazz band perform with Willie Dixon. The two then ride on Rick's bike and Rick's tells Courtney that he feels inspiration coming on making Courtney laugh and answers "We can't do that here" to which he responds "Oh Yes we can". Later while riding, Rick ask Courntey to direct him and places her hands covering his eyes. He tells her takes them off she'll lose. She calls him crazy but accepts the challenge asshe directs him and the two wind up back at his place having sex again.

The next scene is Rick practicing with band preparing for a money reward competition, but Michelle is distracted and messed up the lyrics. This causes an argument to break out between her and the other players and she ends up quitting after realizing her relationship with Rick has been over for a year already. So Rick suggest Courtney take Michelle's place after he realizes she knows all the songs and notes. He evens offers to help her with her stage fright and dance moves, which is seen in a montage. Courtney proves to be a better musician than Michelle and are ready for the showcase.

The following night Diana shows up at club with her friends and is surprised to see Courtney working as waitress and afterwards calls Jeffery to inform him. Jefferey is angered to this discover and tells Diana he will be coming home. Courtney is then called into Rocco's office and Rocco tells her it's best if her and Rick stop seeing each other, because it's unhealthy for him and no good for her. He then informs her of Rick's police record of fighting and drug handling, he calls her a class act, which exposes the fact that Marvin knows of her being a waitress. Rocco tells Courtney that she will ruin any chance for Rick and if she loves him, to leave him alone. Courtney realizes this all her Father's doing and storms out of the office and ditches practice to go home. She is then scene holding a photo of her mom crying and wanting to be Rick, only to know that Marvin is threatening to ruin Rick's career if he and Courtney stay together.

The next day Diana is back at the Club and Tracy gets Diana to tell Rick about Courtney's family in Beverly Hills and even reveals that Courtney is Marvin Wells daughter. Rick then confronts Courtney and is upset to know that she had been keeping this from him. He feels like charity case, and ask Courtney if that is all their relationship was. Upsetting Courtney she asked if the homeless man she saw was his drug dealer or his own charity case, to which he reveals is his father. Only upsetting both of them, the two carry on with their night, Rick performs another song dedicated to Courtney drunk and sad. She continues to work her shift, but is upset with the song. The scene montages with Marvin looking at Rick's Record and Jefferey on his way to Bel-Air with Diana.

Jefferey then shows up at Rocco's and confronts Rick, mocking him about drugs and girls. Jefferey then goes to Courtney's place unannounced, he explains that he wanted to spontaneous and mocks Courtney for living there and kisses her, which makes Courtney mad and she pushes him away as he still think they are still together. He begs her not to throw him out, because its late and he has to much to drink. Courtney then allows him to stay on the couch, much to his dismay.

Meanwhile, Rick goes to visit father at a hotel room to discover him laying dead on the floor of a drug overdose. The following morning when Courtney goes to practice with the band, she is informed of Rick's loss and goes to find him at the service they are holding for him at skidrow. A bunch homeless folk are with Rick in the church drinking and mourning the death of his father. Courtney arrives to Rick's surprise and he continues to mourn. He then leaves and tells Courtney he wants nothing to do with her.

The next few days Courtney is back at work and harassed by Jefferey who is agitated with her working there and tries to convince her to leave as he finds it demeaning. He then grabs her and tells her they are leaving to New York and getting married, but as she remains noncompliant, she slaps him and he apologizes saying he is drunk. Courtney the. Lies on the floor upset with Ethel there to comfort her. The scene then cuts to Jefferey and Diana arguing over Courtney, because he feels framing Rick will convince Courtney to quit. After Diana refuses to help Jefferey, he attacks her and the scene cuts back to the bar the next night.

Rick gets a phone call from Marvin Wells, who tries to make deal with Rick, but after he refuses, Marvin blackmails him. Rick still doesn't comply, even after Rocco tries to convince him to take up Marvin's offer. We then see Jefferey drunk along with two hookers trying to frame Rick as he plants drugs on his bike. The two Prostitutes then distract the bandmates as Courtney begins her shift, she sees Rick unhappy. Rocco announces the showcase will be in two days and agents will be there signing deals for the armature bands, Rocco is then booked off the stage following another soft rock band. When drummer Scott (Bentley Mitchu)) convinces Rick to talk with one of the Prostitutes, she removes her blouse and pulls out cocaine as the drummer and the other hooked snort the drugs. Rick very uncomfortable at this moment rejects the offers and leaves because he doesn't want to go down the path he did three years ago. But police arrive wanting to talk with the band and Rick aware of the police on their trail tries to help them escape knowing he has been set up by Jefferey.

The police end up catching rick and the drugs Jefferey planted on him. Rocco announce the booked Rick and his bail is set at ten thousand dollars, but his band argue that Rick is innocent. Due to this being his second offense, he could be facing serious time.

The next morning Diana shows up at Courtney's door removing her sunglasses and revealing her black eye, busted lip, and bruised cheek. She admits that Jefferey beat her and set up Rick. Later Courtney calls Marvin in hope's of getting money out of her trustfund. But to no avail, Courtney pawns her bracelet the only thing left she has of her mothers. She manages to bail Rick out, without either of two seeing each other. Rick returns to Club and Rocco suggest he go home but Rick only wants to get ready for the show, both men drink.

Next we see that Tracy discovers the bail bond for Rick, and tells Courtney she misunderstood her and apologizes for giving her giving a hard time. Courtney makes Tracy promise not tell Rick she bailed him out because she doesn't want him to think she is trying but him, and Tracy agrees because of how much pride Rick has. Next we see the band upset because they need Courtney and Rick refusing to talk to her with the showcase coming up the following night.

It's the night of the Showcase and many rock bands are performing. Marvin is in limousine on his way to showcase. Rocco announces the house band Breakout which is finally revealed. Meanwhile, Tracy and the drummer try to convince Courtney to perform with them, Tracy gives her a change of clothes and she sets up on stage. Rick is surprised to see Courtney and was thinking she wouldn't show up. The two perform "Break This House" incorporating the dance moves they practiced together. Jefferey watches in horror and Marvin walks in the club to see his daughter perform and is shocked by the display. When their performance ends, the whole kitchen congratulates Courtney and the band. Rocco goes to introduce himself to agents and discuss the terms of signing Breakout. But is distracted when he sees Marvin.

Marvin is upset that his plan to separate Courtney and Rick didn't work and Rocco assures him that of not for Marvin finding the showcase in the first place and getting the agents here, Rick and Courtney wouldn't have ended back together. As it is on Marvin's blame they met. Meanwhile, a drunk Jefferey attacks Rick as he is putting away his equipment. The two end up fighting with Courtney and Tracy in terror, Courtney admits that Jefferey set him up and Rick beats him up in front of Marvin. After the fight finishes Rick leaves upset as he knows it was Marvin's doing, and Marvin's calls out for Courtney needing to take her home. He his daughter that she above all those people and doesn't belong there, and demands she come home. But she refuses by saying "You want me to play by your rules. You'll do anything to get your own way, won't you?". But he tells her that's the way the world works, but she tells him that's not her way she then walks away from him to find Rick, making it known she is not going to back to that life.

We see her outside and Rick on his motorcycle. The two stare at each other and smile at each other, she ends up getting on his bike and hold each other tight and ride off into the night without looking back.

Release 
Originally intended to a made-for-television film, Columbia Pictures RCA home video picked up the project to make it a direct-to-video release but when Studio Three Films and Film West picked up the project, it managed to receive a limited release through select theaters nationwide. The film was on a budget of $785,000 budget, but grossed $368,056 in its first week and a total $561,000 from its time in theaters. The film was rated R and in the following months RCA Home Video released the film on VHS  the next three years the film would debut on Showtime (TV network) and HBO. The film has yet to be released on streaming platforms and DVD. The film even got three different Trailer made to advertise the movie.

Reception 
Due to film being shelved twice and getting two releases the film met mixed reviews with a great amount of negative reviews from movie critics, most famously from The Washington Post which ripped on the movie  Rita Kemply wrote an article in 1991 criticizing the acting as too much a mellow drama comparing it to Dirty Dancing and Gas Pump Girls. Other reviews felt the selling poster and movie based on the Hall & Oates song title was too similar to Pretty Woman. Because of the negative reviews from Kemply the film was dropped from award nominations it was originally up for the soundtrack by Jay Chattaway. All the music was done live and actually performed by Schoelen and Paul. Many people were pleased by actual live performances by Precious Metal (band), Darling Cruel, Celebrity Skin (band), and Willie Dixon. Cherie Currie never promoted the film after starring in it. But since it has yet to become a Cult classic like Schoelen previous film Popcorn (1991 film).

Cast 
 Jill Schoelen as Courtney Wells
 Don Michael Paul as Rick Asbury
 Sean Kanan as Jefferey Banks
 Paul Gleason as Marvin Wells
 Ron Karabatsos as Rocco
 Cherie Currie as Michelle
 Willie Dixon as Himself
 Melanie Tomlin as Diana
 Trudi Forristal as Tracy
 Ann Gillespie as Carol
 Bentley Mitchum as Scott
 Lex Lang as Dennis
 Eddy Griffith as Mr. Asbury
 Peter Cohl as Chopin
 Lance Carter (musician) as Drummer 
 Gail Neely as Ethel
 Ingrid Berg as Angela Carpoli
 Celebrity Skin (band) as Themselves
 Darling Cruel as Themselves
 Precious Metal (band) as Themselves
 Linda Galloway as Businesswoman
 Isabel Cooley as Counselor
 Kirk Scott as Investment Banker
 Frederick Flynn as Landlord 
 Alicia Lassiter as Blond Temptress
 Irving William Moseley Jr. as The Minister
 Daphne Cheung as Oriental Temptress
 Chuck Courtney (actor) as Police Officer #1
 Christopher Doyle as Police Officer #2
 Mark Riccardi as Bar Tough #1
 Lincoln Simonds as Bar Tough #2
 Larry Gelman as Pawnbroker
 Cynthia Geary as Sorority Girl #1
 Linda West as Sorority Girl #2
 Doyle McCurley as Prison Guard
 Hans Howes as Police Sergeant 
 Kristine Seeley as Groupie

References

External links

1991 films
1991 romantic drama films
American romantic drama films
1990s English-language films
1990s American films